The Daily Trojan, or "DT," is the student newspaper of the University of Southern California. The newspaper is a forum for student expression and is written, edited, and managed by university students. The paper is intended to inform USC students, faculty, and staff on the latest news and provide opinion and entertainment. Student writers, editors, photographers and artists can develop their talents and air their opinions while providing a service to the campus community through the Daily Trojan. Readers can interact with the Daily Trojan by commenting on articles online or writing a letter to the editor.

Publication
It is published Monday through Friday (during regularly scheduled class days) and distributed at various locations around campus. Articles are also available online at the official Daily Trojan web site. The Daily Trojan is produced weekly as the "Summer Trojan" during the summer session, typically on Wednesdays, from commencement until July.

Although the length of the Daily Trojan varies depending on the volume of advertisements, larger issues throughout the semester include the Orientation version, Career Guide, Transportation Guide, and Restaurant Guide. Starting in 2006, at least four pages (two spreads) of the paper are printed in color. Additional color pages vary with each issue.

Each currently issue contains a news, opinion, lifestyle and sports section and each section has its own senior editor(s) and staff.

The Daily Trojan is an affiliate of UWIRE, which distributes and promotes its content to their network. The paper also publishes all of its articles online, with some publications, such as podcasts and videos, being available online exclusively.

History

The first edition of the newspaper was published September 16, 1912, after W.R. “Ralph” La Porte, the first student editor of the paper, persuaded university President George Finley Bovard to give USC a student newspaper. Subscriptions to the paper, then called The Daily Southern Californian, originally cost $1.75. The newspaper was called The Southern Californian in 1915, after it began publishing only four days a week, but returned to five-day-a-week production in 1925 and was renamed The Daily Trojan, as USC had informally adopted the Trojan as a mascot by then.

The newspaper moved from the now-defunct Moneta Print Shop on Jefferson and University Avenues to its current location in the Student Union in 1928. Production was held off-campus until the 1980s in USC's Graphic Services Department, which was located west of the [Harbor Freeway] on Exposition Boulevard. The Daily Trojan increasingly began using computers in the '90s, moving to all-digital production in 2005. Editors create the paper using Adobe InDesign, InCopy, Photoshop, Illustrator and Dreamweaver. The Daily Trojan's first website was created in 1996, and has gone through several iterations.

Organization
While the university publishes the Daily Trojan, student editors and staff handle all day-to-day operations. Unlike many university newspapers, the Daily Trojan receives no financial support from the university or from student government funding allocations, and is wholly supported by advertising revenue. The Daily Trojan is part of USC's Office of Student Publications, which is part of USC's Division of Student Affairs. The office oversees the publishing of both the Daily Trojan and El Rodeo yearbook.

Awards and recognition
The Daily Trojan and its staffers earn national, state and regional awards on an annual basis. Listed below are some of the prominent honors the Daily Trojan has received organizationally.

National 
Associated Collegiate Press – Pacemaker Awards

 Newspaper Pacemaker
 Winner: 2017, 1991
 Online Pacemaker
 Winner: 2016

State 
California College Media Association – Excellence in Student Media Awards

 2018
 Received 15 state awards, including first-place recognition for Best Editorial, Best Multimedia Presentation, Best Social Media for a Single Event, Best Sports Photo and Best Special Issue/Section
 2019
 Received 22 state awards, including first-place recognition for Best Special Issue/Section, Best News Series, Best Podcast, Best Editorial, Best Non-News Video, Best Sports Story, Best Infographic and Best Interactive Graphic

Notable alumni
Many staff members for the Daily Trojan have gone on to highly visible positions in media outlets, most prominently satirist Art Buchwald.
Other high-profile former staff include:
 Paresh Dave, technology reporter for Reuters
 Paul Feig, creator of Freaks and Geeks and director of Bridesmaids
 Jordyn Holman, retail reporter for Bloomberg News
 Herb Klein, communications director in the Nixon White House and later a top news executive with Copley Press in California
 Arash Markazi, journalist for Sports Illustrated and ESPN Los Angeles
 Kate Mather, reporter for the Los Angeles Times
 David Milhous, Emmy-winning editor of the syndicated TV series Crime Watch Daily
 Dan Povenmire, co-creator of the Disney animated series Phineas and Ferb
 Tucker Reed, author, journalist, feminist and convicted killer
 Jennifer Medina, national politics reporter for The New York Times
 Justin Chang, film critic for the Los Angeles Times and Fresh Air
 Laura J. Nelson, transportation and mobility reporter for the Los Angeles Times
 Matt Brennan, Senior Editor for the Los Angeles Times
 Anshu Siripurapu, reporter at Inside U.S. Trade
 Yasmeen Serhan, reporter and editor for The Atlantic
 Chelsea Stone, commerce editor for CNN Underscored
 Bob Staake, illustrator and cartoonist
 Lionel Van Deerlin, print and broadcast journalist (primarily in San Diego), U.S. Representative from 1963–81

References

External links
 
 Facebook Page
 Twitter Feed
 Famous Alumni of the Daily Trojan

Student activities at the University of Southern California
Newspapers published in Greater Los Angeles
Student newspapers published in California
American student news websites
Daily newspapers published in California